Cosingas was a chieftain of the Thracian Cebrenii, the Sycaeboae, and a priest of Hera.

References

See also 
List of Thracian tribes
 
Thracian kings